Francisco Mayorga (Born in 1949 in León, Nicaragua) is a Nicaraguan economist and writer who specializes in international finance and economic development. 

For twenty years he taught managerial economics and corporate finance at INCAE, the leading Latin American graduate business school. In the eighties he served for five years in the board of directors of the Central American Bank (CABEI), the largest financial institution of the region.
In the eighties, Mayorga also worked for the cause of peace in Central America, acting as Executive Secretary of the International Commission for Central American Recovery and Development (the Sanford Commission).

Under the presidency of Violeta Chamorro he served as president of the Central Bank of Nicaragua in 1990, where he launched the monetary reform based on the Cordoba Oro that brought to an end the highest hyperinflation in Latin America. In 1995 he founded Banco del Café de Nicaragua, serving as its President and CEO until the year 2000, when in the midst of a banking crisis it collapsed along with half of the Nicaraguan financial institutions.

An active Christian Democrat and opponent to the government of Arnoldo Alemán, Mayorga was prosecuted on the basis of charges which proved to be false. Mayorga was never convicted but spent two and a half years in jail as a political prisoner. He faced trial twice, assuming his own defense. Mayorga succeeded in winning his acquittal by two successive juries in 2001 and 2003. The Human Rights Commissioner of Nicaragua declared twice the violation of Mayorga's rights: one for retardation of justice and one for double jeopardy.

Literature works: Mayorga also wrote two novels in prison: La Puerta de los Mares (2001) and El Hijo de la Estrella (2003), both published in Managua by LEA Grupo Editorial. In subsequent years he occasionally published short stories and poems, returning to the novel in May 2014 with El Filatelista (Ediciones Albertus, Managua). In 2016 he published his fourth novel, Cinco estrellas (Ediciones Albertus, Managua), dealing with the ascension to power of dictator Anastasio Somoza Garcia. 
 
In 2003 he returned to academic life as Dean of the Albertus Magnus International Institute, a small private Central American organization devoted to higher learning and research in economics, finance and international business. 

Economic writings: In 2007 he published Megacapitales de Nicaragua (Managua: Ediciones Albertus), a study of the major economic groups in Nicaragua, their business strategies and their implications for economic development. His latest book, Nicaragua 2010: El Futuro de la Economía (Ediciones Albertus, 2008), is an analysis of the changing economic structure of Nicaragua as a consequence of the increased demand for biofuels and its impact on agricultural prices. Both books continue to exercise considerable influence in the debate about the Nicaraguan economy.

In 2009-2010 Mr. Mayorga was the Central American spokesman in the negotiation of the financial instrument of the Association Agreement with the European Union.

He worked at Albertus for eight years, resigning in June 2011 to serve in the Board of Directors of the Inter American Development Bank (IDB) in Washington. For 10 years he served as the Executive Director on behalf of the Central American countries in the IDB and IDBInvest Boards. Currently, he is the President of the Universidad Privada Boliviana,  a prestigiuos university in Bolivia for undergraduate and graduate studies.
 
Mr. Mayorga holds a doctorate (1986) and two master's degrees (1985, 1972) from Yale University.

References

Presidents of Central Bank of Nicaragua
Nicaraguan male writers
Nicaraguan economists
1949 births
Living people